Deep Purple (also released as Dreams Come True) is an album by Sun Ra and his Arkestra featuring Stuff Smith on violin.

Pressings
Saturn LP 485 (1973)
side A reissued on Evidence 22014 (CD, 1992)
side B reissued on Evidence 22217 (CD, 2000)

Track listing

Side A
 "Deep Purple" (DeRose, Parish) Sun Ra (p, Solovox); Stuff Smith (vln). Sun Ra's apartment, Chicago, c.1953
 "Piano Interlude" (Ra) Sun Ra (p). Chicago, c. 1955
 "Can This Be Love?" (Swift, James)Sun Ra (p); Wilbur Ware (b). Chicago, c. 1955
 "Dreams Come True" (Ra, Mayo)Sun Ra (Wurlitzer ep); Pat Patrick (as); John Gilmore (ts); Art Hoyle (tp); Vic Sproles (b); Robert Barry (d); Clyde Williams (voc). Chicago, 1956.
 "Don't Blame Me" (McHugh, Fields)Sun Ra (p); Victor Sproles (b); Robert Barry (d); Tito (cga); Hattie Randolph (voc). Budland, Chicago, late 1956 or early 1957.
 "'S Wonderful" (Gershwin)Sun Ra (p); Victor Sproles (b); Robert Barry (d); Tito (cga); Hattie Randolph (voc). Budland, Chicago, late 1956 or early 1957.
 "Lover, Come Back to Me" (Romberg, Hammerstein)Sun Ra (p); Victor Sproles (b); Robert Barry (d); Tito (cga); Hattie Randolph (voc). Budland, Chicago, late 1956 or early 1957.

Art Hoyle was in the band from Christmas 1955 through December 1956; Tito identified by Lucious Randolph, who says he was "very African looking" and worked with Ra for a year or so; Randolph says the tracks with his sister Hattie were made after he joined the Arkestra. She confirms that Art Hoyle was out of the band by then, and thinks these were recorded at the old Budland in the basement of the Pershing Hotel.

"Piano Interlude" and "Can This Be Love?" were included on a tape of what later became The Invisible Shield Side B, sold by Sun Ra to Alan Bates of Black Lion/Freedom in the early 70s. [Vein]

Side B
 "The World of the Invisible" (Ra)
 "The Order of the Pharaonic Jesters" (Ra)
 "The Land of the Day Star" (Ra)

Sun Ra (keyb); Kwame Hadi (Lamont McClamb) (tp); Akh Tal Ebah (D. E. Williams) (tp); Marshall Allen (as); John Gilmore (ts, perc); Eloe Omoe (bcl); Ronnie Boykins (b); Harry Richards (d); Derek Morris (d, perc). Probably Philadelphia, 1973 [Personnel from album jacket, sorted out by rlc); dates from Buzelin and Stahl, corrected by rlc]

References

Sun Ra albums
1973 albums